Hussain Khan Thoro, also called Thora Hussain Khan, is a village and deh in Hyderabad taluka of Hyderabad District, Sindh. As of 2017, it has a population of 6,391, in 1,228 households. It is the head of a tapedar circle which also includes the villages of Ghotana, Gul Mohd Khan, and Mati, Sindh.

References 

Populated places in Hyderabad District, Pakistan